Feyzabad-e Mish Mast (also Romanized as Feyẕābād-e Mīsh Mast; also known as Feyẕābād and Mīsh Mast) is a village in Zam Rural District, Pain Jam District, Torbat-e Jam County, Razavi Khorasan Province, Iran. At the 2006 census, its population was 589, in 133 families.

References 

Populated places in Torbat-e Jam County